The San Francisco Bicycle Advisory Committee consists of 11 San Francisco voting members appointed by the San Francisco Board of Supervisors, each of whom resides in one of the 11 supervisorial districts and is nominated by their district's supervisor. In addition to the 11 voting members, non-voting representatives from the following city departments attend committee meetings: the Police Department, the Department of Public Works, the Municipal Railway, the Department of City Planning, and the Bureau of Engineering of the Department of Parking and Traffic.

Meetings 
The committee meets on the fourth Thursday of each month to consider bicycle transportation projects and policies and to make recommendations to the Board of Supervisors, the Department of Parking and Traffic, and other San Francisco agencies.

History 
The committee was established by Ordinance 365-90 on 1990-11-09.

Projects 
Committee projects include oversight and facilitation of the five-year Bicycle Plan Update, improved transit access for bicycles, and funding for bicycle improvements to increase road safety.

Committee members

References

External links
San Francisco Bicycle Advisory Committee

Government of San Francisco
Organizations based in San Francisco
Cycling organizations in the United States
Cycling in San Francisco